Hermann V may refer to:

 Hermann V, Margrave of Baden-Baden (died 1243)
 Hermann V von Wied (1477–1552) 

ru:Герман V